Asymphorodes aporema is a moth of the family Agonoxenidae. It is found on Guam.

References

Moths described in 1987
Agonoxeninae
Moths of Oceania
Endemic fauna of Guam